Spring Garden is a census-designated place (CDP) in Plumas County, California, United States. The population was 16 at the 2010 census, down from 55 at the 2000 census.

Geography

Demographics

2000
At the 2000 census there were 55 people, 23 households, and 14 families in the CDP. The racial makeup of the CDP was 100.00% White. Hispanic or Latino of any race were 3.64%.

Of the 23 households 17.4% had children under the age of 18 living with them, 47.8% were married couples living together, 8.7% had a female householder with no husband present, and 39.1% were non-families. 34.8% of households were one person and 13.0% were one person aged 65 or older. The average household size was 2.39 and the average family size was 2.93.

The age distribution was 23.6% under the age of 18, 3.6% from 18 to 24, 18.2% from 25 to 44, 43.6% from 45 to 64, and 10.9% 65 or older. The median age was 46 years. For every 100 females, there were 96.4 males. For every 100 females age 18 and over, there were 133.3 males.

The median household income was $30,179 and the median family income  was $30,179. Males had a median income of $0 versus $21,250 for females. The per capita income for the CDP was $12,062. None of the population and none of the families were below the poverty line.

2010
At the 2010 census Spring Garden had a population of 16. The population density was 24.5 people per square mile (9.5/km). The racial makeup of Spring Garden was 15 (93.8%) White, 0 (0.0%) African American, 0 (0.0%) Native American, 1 (6.3%) Asian, 0 (0.0%) Pacific Islander, 0 (0.0%) from other races, and 0 (0.0%) from two or more races.  Hispanic or Latino of any race were 0 people (0.0%).

The whole population lived in households, no one lived in non-institutionalized group quarters and no one was institutionalized.

There were 9 households, 1 (11.1%) had children under the age of 18 living in them, 5 (55.6%) were opposite-sex married couples living together, 0 (0%) had a female householder with no husband present, 1 (11.1%) had a male householder with no wife present.  There were 0 (0%) unmarried opposite-sex partnerships, and 0 (0%) same-sex married couples or partnerships. 3 households (33.3%) were one person and 0 (0%) had someone living alone who was 65 or older. The average household size was 1.78.  There were 6 families (66.7% of households); the average family size was 2.17.

The age distribution was 1 people (6.3%) under the age of 18, 1 people (6.3%) aged 18 to 24, 1 people (6.3%) aged 25 to 44, 7 people (43.8%) aged 45 to 64, and 6 people (37.5%) who were 65 or older.  The median age was 57.5 years. For every 100 females, there were 128.6 males.  For every 100 females age 18 and over, there were 150.0 males.

There were 11 housing units at an average density of 16.9 per square mile, of the occupied units 7 (77.8%) were owner-occupied and 2 (22.2%) were rented. The homeowner vacancy rate was 0%; the rental vacancy rate was 0%.  14 people (87.5% of the population) lived in owner-occupied housing units and 2 people (12.5%) lived in rental housing units.

Politics

References

Census-designated places in Plumas County, California
Census-designated places in California